Al Quoz, or "El Goze" in Emirati Arabic  is a locality / town in Dubai, United Arab Emirates (UAE). Al Quoz is located in western Dubai. It is bordered to the north by Al Wasl and to the west by Umm Al Sheif, Al Manara and Al Safa, forming a long rectangle between Al Khail and Sheikh Zayed roads.    

Al Quoz is mainly known for its art galleries, factories, parks, and eateries.

Organization 
Al Quoz consists of a mainly residential area in the northeast and an industrial area in the southwest with four subcommunities each. 

The residential areas of Al Quoz 1, 2 and 4 are home to mainly Emirati families. The newest of which is Al Quoz 2 which is an ex-landfill and it is south of Al Khail road towards Meydan and the only area outside the rectangle. It hosts Al Quoz Pond Park and borders the newly built MBR City. while Al Quoz 3 is mainly industrial. 

Al Quoz industrial areas 1, 2, 3 and 4 are in the southwest of the rectangle, and is being developed by Dubai Municipality as an industrial and mass accommodation area. It service development projects such as Dubai Marina and the freezone in Jebel Ali as well as many hotels by hosting facilities that are able to house thousands of workers and staff.

Al Quoz Creative District 
The government of Dubai launched the Al Quoz Creative District as part of Dubai 2040 cityplan, it will serve as a one‑stop shop and free zone area for creative‑related services, and as a centre for issuing relevant business permits and visas.

The new zone will be an integrated development, with multipurpose spaces for artists, designers and other creatives to live, work, exhibit and sell their products. Suitable operatives registered in the new zone will be eligible for the Al Quoz Creative membership programme, that will provide benefits such as exemptions on import, export and visa issuance fees; licensing fees; and Dubai Chamber of Commerce and Industry fees. Other incentives will include low rents and logistical business support. For entrepreneurial start‑ups, training programmes will also be available for help in turning creative ideas into businesses.

Creative fields targeted for the district include writing, publishing and print; audio‑visual media, such as cinema, music and video; and artistic and cultural industries, such as historic‑site‑related, cultural heritage museums, libraries and major cultural events. Video gaming and software industries will also be encouraged, along with the full sweep of commercial design including fashion, gaming, software, and architecture.

The project is the first of a number of government initiatives launched under the Dubai Creative Economy Strategy that seeks to improve Dubai’s attractiveness to creators, entrepreneurs, investors, and local and global investments in creative industries. The goal is to transform the emirate into a global capital for innovation by 2025.

Events 
In March 2007, labourers from Al Quoz industrial rioted, as part of a larger 8,000 strong protest against contracting companies, demanding better living conditions and a wage increase of 200 dhs (US$ 55) and a food allowance of 50 dhs (US$ 42) per month.

On 26 March 2008, an explosion ripped through two warehouses in Al Quoz industrial killing at least two people.  The explosion originated from a warehouse storing gas and subsequently ignited a warehouse next door containing fireworks.  Flames from the explosion spread to seventy warehouses nearby, causing at least Dh 600,000,000 ($170 mil) of damage.  Debris from the gas warehouse and fireworks warehouse landed as far away as the communities of Al Safa and Jumeirah.  This was the seventh industrial accident in Al Quoz in five years.

On 25 April 2022,  a worker in Al Quoz industrial has been sentenced to life in jail for killing his employer who rejected his leave request to travel back home. the 23-year-old man, who worked at a garage in Al Quoz Industrial area, had a heated argument with his manager before slitting his throat with a sharp knife and then smashing his head with a hammer.

Attractions 
Al Quoz is known for its many art galleries, housed in warehouse spaces. Several contemporary art galleries are located on Alserkal Avenue such as Carbon 12 Dubai, Isabelle Van den Eynde Gallery, Green art gallery, FN Designs, The Mine, Exotic Cars and The Elite Cars.

References

See also 
2008 Dubai explosion

Communities in Dubai